Bibi Smit (born 1965) is a Dutch glass artist and designer known for creating objects and installations that explore the patterns and rhythms caused by movement in nature. The process of making is a fundamental quality of her artistic practice and teaching experience.

Early life and education 
Bibi Smit was born in 1965 in Son en Breugel, The Netherlands. In 1984, she moved to England to study at the West Surrey College of Art and Design in Farnham. From 1988 to 1989, she worked as a glassblowing assistant with David Kaplan and Annica Sandstrom at Lindean Mill Glass, Scotland. She established a small studio with equipment for grinding and polishing, whilst blowing her designs at Edinburgh College of Art and a hire furnace in Newcastle upon Tyne. In 1997, she attended a workshop at North Lands Creative in Lybster and participated in the next year at the Summer Glass Studio in the Leerdam Glass Center. Since 2006, she has worked in her glassblowing studio in the Netherlands.

Artistic career 
Smit received her Bachelor of Arts Honours degree in 3D Design Glass in 1988. In the same year, Two Double-Bubble Vases were selected for “New Glass Review 9”, a publication of the Corning Museum of Glass. Since her early career, she lectured in European studios and at the Edinburgh College of Art and the University of Sunderland. After living fourteen years in the United Kingdom, Smit moved back to the Netherlands, to the heart of Amsterdam. She was a guest lecturer at Danmarks Designskole, in Copenhagen, in 1996.

She was the co-coordinator and head teacher of the Hot Glass workshop programme at Van Tetterode Glasobjecten in Amsterdam from 1998 to 2006. In 1999, she led the 2nd International Glass Workshop for Women at Häme Polytechnic/Wetterhof School of Craft and Design, in Nuutajärvi (Finland), where 14 participants from Finland, England, the USA, and Norway and a visiting group from Russia worked alongside sharing ideas, developing installations for outside. In 2000, Smit was invited to participate at the Lednické Rovne International Glass Symposium, in Slovak Republic

In 2002, Smit was invited to design and make the "Ledenobject" of the Friends of Modern Glass and selected for an artist residency at North Lands Creative, in Scotland during the following year. Between 2005 and 2012, she was also a board member of the Friends of Modern Glass. During the Glasrijk Tubbergen International Glass Art event in 2013, Smit presented a series of pieces inspired by the solar flares and trees shapes, examining the relationship between shape and deformation in glass. According to the director of the National Glass Museum, Arend-Jan Weijsters, her work becomes strong in the unusual intersection between the simplicity of form and the mysterious appearance.

Since 2016, her work has been selected for the Dutch pavilion during the Salone del Mobile in Milan, curated by Nicole Uniquole. In 2019, she showcased the “Swarm” chandeliers and a series of vases in a presentation, which was inspired by the light and colour palette of the master painter Rembrandt van Rijn. The fragile glass birds suggested the movement of large flocks of starlings. She is called la Venini dei Paesi Bassi, which means the Venini of the Low Countries, referring to the famous Venetian glass designer and namesake of the largest glass factory in glass, in Murano. In 2018, Smit presented the Copier Unveiled, a new series for the "Copier Revisited" collection at Royal Leerdam Crystal.

Works 
Smit’s works were deeply influenced by the Scottish landscape, nature and light. Since that period, she developed an interest in making works that interacted with its environment, particularly inspired by the spaces outside of her studio, nature and the experience of certain spaces. The similarities of forces in nature and in her own body are mirrored in the objects she produces, connecting memories with different realities. Her characteristic language is grounded in the combination of hot and cold techniques, such as grinding, cutting, sandblasting and polishing. According to Caroline van Diest, Smit’s language “is not a language of words, but of symbols and colours. It is born from feelings, personal symbols and memories. It is the rapture of the beauty of nature or life itself. Making glass objects is a way to understand herself and life.” She combined glass with other materials like wood, copper foil or different types of stone in autonomous objects. Her work has increasingly been connected to nature and the material itself, in the search for beauty and eagerness to achieve new knowledge about glass fluidity and movement.

Collections 
Smit’s work is held in private and public collections: Nationaal Glasmuseum Leerdam, The Netherlands; The Dan Klein and Alan J. Poole Private Collection of Glass, England; Collection North Lands Creative Glass, Lybster, Scotland; National Museum of Scotland, United Kingdom; Glasmuseum Lette Alter Hof Herding, Ernsting-Stiftung, Coesfeld, Germany.

References

External links 

Bibi Smit Glassblower | Moving Glass

21st-century Dutch women artists
1965 births
People from Son en Breugel
Women glass artists
Living people
20th-century Dutch women artists
Dutch expatriates in England
Alumni of the University for the Creative Arts
Dutch glass artists